Trichotithonus is a genus of beetles in the family Cerambycidae, containing the following species:

 Trichotithonus albidus Monné, 1990
 Trichotithonus albosetosus Monné, 1990
 Trichotithonus conspectus Monné, 1990
 Trichotithonus curvatus (Bates, 1885)
 Trichotithonus tavakiliani Monné, 1990
 Trichotithonus tenebrosus Monné, 1990
 Trichotithonus venezuelensis Monné, 1990
 Trichotithonus viridis Monné, 1990

References

Acanthocinini